The Oregon Environmental Council (OEC) is an environmental advocacy group based in Portland, Oregon, United States. It was founded in 1968.

History
The Oregon Environmental Council was founded in 1968 by a group of "ordinary citizens", including PTA and garden club members, outdoor enthusiasts, conservationists and other individuals who "had an interest in protecting the environmental legacy of Oregon".

Current work
Current program work of the OEC includes public policy, addressing global warming, preventing toxic exposure, improving the quality of Oregon's rivers, sustainable economic issues, and food and farms. Andrea Durbin has been the group's executive director since 2006.

Activities
Activities of the Oregon Environmental Council include:

 1968 - Passed Mount Jefferson Wilderness Bill
 1971 - Led citizen support that passed the Oregon Bottle Bill, the first bottle bill in the nation
 1973 - Helped pass Oregon Senate Bills 100 and 101, Oregon's land use planning law
 1975 - Secured National Recreation Area protection for Hells Canyon
 1977 - Secured nation's first ban on certain ozone-depleting chemicals
 1987 - Created Oregon Superfund Program and the Governor's Watershed Enhancement Board (now known as Oregon Watershed Enhancement Board)
 1991 - Secured the nation's first law requiring state agencies to minimize pesticide use
 1999 - Passed a Pesticide Right to Know Law guaranteeing public access to data about all commercial pesticide use in Oregon 
 2003 - Passed a first-of-its-kind tax incentive for insurance companies to offer Pay-as-You-Drive auto insurance
 2006 - Won United States Environmental Protection Agency (EPA) Children's Environmental Health Excellence Award for their Eco-Healthy Child Care and Tiny Footprints programs that help parents and caregivers reduce children's exposure to toxic chemicals
 2007 -  Passed Climate Change Integration Act, setting greenhouse gas reduction goals for Oregon into statute and established statewide Global Warming Commission
 2007 -  Launched the Carbon Neutral Challenge for Oregon wineries, with dozens of Oregon wineries participating to reduce their carbon footprints
 2008 - Released landmark "Pollution in People" report, which tested the bodies of 10 Oregon men and women for chemicals, followed by the "Price of Pollution" report, the state's first-ever economic assessment of the true costs of environmentally triggered disease in Oregon

See also
Land use in Oregon

References

External links

Environmental organizations based in Oregon
Organizations established in 1968
Organizations based in Portland, Oregon
Land use in Oregon
1968 establishments in Oregon